Aagot Raaen (December 3, 1873 - January 7, 1957) was an American author and educator.

Background
Raaen was one of five children born to Thomas T. Raaen (1827-1903) and Ragnhild (Rodningen) Raaen (1839-1923), who were immigrants from Norway. In June 1874, the family had moved to Dakota Territory settling near Hatton, North Dakota. Thomas Raaen homesteaded 160 acres of land in Newburgh Township (now in Steele County, North Dakota). Aagot Raaen put herself through school and college. In 1903, Raaen graduated from the Mayville State Normal School, now Mayville State University. In 1913, she graduated from the University of Minnesota. She later did graduate work at universities in Berlin and Hawaii.

Career
Raaen taught at rural schools in North Dakota as well as at Oak Grove Lutheran School in Fargo, North Dakota. From 1917 to 1922, she was the Superintendent of Schools in Steele County, North Dakota. In 1922, she began teaching at a number of post-secondary institutions in Hawaii.

Raaen wrote several historical articles and books, including the 1950 autobiographical work Grass of the Earth: Immigrant Life in the Dakota country. Through a description of her family's homesteading days, Raaen detailed pioneer life on the prairie. She also wrote many short essays and biographies of pioneer families.

Selected works
Grass of the Earth: Immigrant Life in the Dakota Country  (Ayer Publishing, 1950) 
Measure of My Days (North Dakota Institute for Regional Studies, 1953) 
Hamarsbön-Raaen Genealogy (Chicago: E. Felland, 1957)

Papers
Raaen's papers are contained at the North Dakota State University Institute for Regional Studies:
Aagot Raaen Photograph Collection
Aagot Raaen Papers, 1915–1953
Institute for Regional Studies records, 1950–present

References

External links
Aagot Raaen Photograph Collection (North Dakota State University Libraries) 
Aagot Raaen Papers, 1915-1953 (North Dakota State University Libraries)
Finding Aid to the  Aagot Raaen Paper (North Dakota State University Libraries)

1873 births
1957 deaths
American people of Norwegian descent
People from Traill County, North Dakota
University of Minnesota alumni
American Lutherans
American autobiographers
Writers from Iowa
Writers from North Dakota
Mayville State University alumni
People from Steele County, North Dakota
Women autobiographers
American women historians